13390 Bouška, provisional designation , is a stony Eunomia asteroid from the central region of the asteroid belt, approximately 7 kilometers in diameter. It was discovered by Czech astronomers Petr Pravec and Marek Wolf at Ondřejov Observatory in the Czech Republic on 18 March 1999. It was named after astronomer Jiří Bouška.

Classification and orbit 

Bouška is a member of the Eunomia family, a large group of S-type asteroids and the most prominent family in the intermediate main-belt. It orbits the Sun in the central main-belt at a distance of 2.1–3.0 AU once every 4 years and 2 months (1,515 days). Its orbit has an eccentricity of 0.18 and an inclination of 13° with respect to the ecliptic.

Physical characteristics 

A rotational lightcurve of Bouška was obtained from photometric observations made at the U.S. Palomar Transient Factory, California, in January 2012. It gave a rotation period of  hours with a brightness variation of 0.30 in magnitude.

Diameter and albedo 

According to the surveys carried out by NASA's space-based Wide-field Infrared Survey Explorer with its subsequent NEOWISE mission, Bouška measures 7.5 and 7.0 kilometers in diameter and its surface has an albedo of 0.26 and 0.27, respectively. The Collaborative Asteroid Lightcurve Link assumes an albedo of 0.21 – derived from 15 Eunomia, the family's largest member and namesake – and calculates a diameter of 6.5 kilometers.

Naming 

This minor planet was named in honor of Jiří Bouška (born 1925), Czech astronomer and retired professor at Charles University, whose research concentrated on the material found between the planets of the Solar System.

Bouška has been a teacher of several generations of Czech astronomers, including one of the discoverers. For decades he has also been the editor of the Czech Astronomical Yearbook and the popular astronomy journal Ríše hvězd (The Realm of Stars), after which the minor planet 4090 Říšehvězd is named. The approved naming citation was published by the Minor Planet Center on 20 March 2000.

References

External links 
 Asteroid Lightcurve Database (LCDB), query form (info )
 Dictionary of Minor Planet Names, Google books
 Asteroids and comets rotation curves, CdR – Observatoire de Genève, Raoul Behrend
 Discovery Circumstances: Numbered Minor Planets (10001)-(15000) – Minor Planet Center
 
 

013390
Discoveries by Petr Pravec
Discoveries by Marek Wolf
Named minor planets
19990318